Here is a list of Anandalok Best Action Hero Award.

See also

 Anandalok Awards
 Tollywood Bangla

External links
www.gomolo.in Anandalok Awards
 www.bollywoodhungama.com Anandalok Awards

Anandalok Puraskar